2007 in cycle racing may refer to:

 2007 in men's road cycling
 2007 in women's road cycling
 2007 in men's cyclo-cross
 2007 in women's cyclo-cross
 2007 in track cycling

See also
 2007 in sports